The Hobbit is a pinball machine designed by Joe Balcer and released by Jersey Jack Pinball in March 2016. It is based on The Hobbit films of the same name which is based on J. R. R. Tolkien’s 1937 novel The Hobbit.

Overview
The Hobbit is Jersey Jacks second pinball machine and follow-up to Wizard of Oz machine released in 2013.  Jersey Jack employed a lot of the new technology introduced in the Wizard of Oz including a 27-inch LCD monitor mounted in the backglass.  Jersey Jack revised the general illumination to be much brighter by using a new LED lighting system allowing higher-brightness LEDs to be used resulting in a much brighter playfield. The pinball table also includes a shaker motor that shakes the table to coincide with the speakers. The game was originally supposed to be released in 2014, but was delayed until 2016. The game sold for a full price of US$8000. "Limited" and "Black Arrow" editions of the pinball game were also released, though these cost more.

Objectives
Bilbo Baggins is on a quest to reclaim their home from Smaug and recover the Arkenstone.

There are four skill shots:

Dwarf Skill Shot
Elf Skill Shot
Lock Skill Shot
Inlane Skill Shot

In addition, there are 31 modes separated into six types as well as different multiballs.

References

External links
 
 (Black Arrow Special Edition)
 (Hobbit Motion Picture Trilogy Limited Edition)
 (Hobbit Smaug Gold Special Edition)

Pinball machines based on films
2016 pinball machines
Jersey Jack pinball machines
Works based on The Hobbit